The Cahaba River Wildlife Management Area is an  Alabama Wildlife Management Area (WMA) operated by the Alabama Department of Conservation and Natural Resources in Bibb and Shelby Counties near West Blocton, Alabama. The WMA is most notable for the long stretch of free-flowing Cahaba River within its boundaries. Uses of the WMA include large (deer and turkey) and small (squirrel, rabbit, etc.) game hunting, fishing, biking, hiking, and wildlife photography.

References

External links
 Alabama Department of Conservation and Natural Resources Map of Cahaba River Wildlife Management Area
 Cahaba River WMA (unofficial site)
U.S. Geological Survey Map public area at the U.S. Geological Survey Map Website. Retrieved February 2, 2023.
U.S. Geological Survey Map private area at the U.S. Geological Survey Map Website. Retrieved February 2, 2023.

Protected areas of Shelby County, Alabama
Protected areas of Bibb County, Alabama
Wildlife management areas of Alabama